The West Branch Delaware River is one of two branches that form the Delaware River. It is approximately 90 mi (144 km) long, and flows through the U.S. states of New York and Pennsylvania. It winds through a mountainous area of New York in the western Catskill Mountains for most of its course, before joining the East Branch along the northeast border of Pennsylvania with New York. Midway or so it is empounded by the Cannonsville Dam to form the Cannonsville Reservoir, both part of the New York City water supply system for delivering drinking water to the City.

Course
It rises in Schoharie County, New York and flows generally southwest, entering Delaware County and flowing past Stamford and Delhi. In southwestern Delaware County it flows in an increasingly winding course through the mountains, generally southwest. At Stilesville it is impounded to form the Cannonsville Reservoir. At Deposit, on the border between Broome and Delaware counties, it turns sharply to the southeast and is paralleled by New York State Route 17. It joins the East Branch at Hancock to form the Delaware. For the lower 6 mi (10 km) it forms part of the boundary between New York and Pennsylvania.

Hydrology

The United States Geological Survey (USGS) maintains many stream gauges along the West Branch Delaware River.

Outside the period of record: In the flood of October 10, 1903 this station reached a discharge of roughly

Fishing
The West Branch is tailwater fishery. This means the same cold water releases that keep it cooler in the summer, keep the river a little warmer in the winter and early spring. The upper section can be cleaner than other rivers during periods of heavy runoff. During high water on the Cannonsville Reservoir, many bait fish spill over the dam. These factors all provide and excellent environment for trout to thrive in.

The trout population in this river is naturally reproducing, during the warm months stocked trout from smaller and warmer tributaries will seek sanctuary in its cool water. The West Branch Delaware River was divided into two sections when the Cannonsville Reservoir was formed. Downstream of the Cannonsville Reservoir, there are large numbered wild populations of brown trout and rainbow trout and an occasional brook trout can be caught although none are stocked. Seasonal anadromous runs of american shad with reports of occasional striped bass. This section is considered one of the best fly fishing trout streams in the United States, due to the cold water released from the reservoir.

Tributaries
Not including tributaries of Cannonsville Reservoir

Right
 Basset Brook
 Lake Brook
 McMurdy Brook
 Betty Brook
 Kiff Brook
 Wright Brook
 Kidd Brook
 Elk Creek
 Falls Creek
 Steele Brook
 Peaks Brook
 Platner Brook
 East Brook
 West Brook
 Pines Brook
 Bobs Brook
 Wakeman Brook
 Cold Spring Creek
 Butler Brook
 Oquaga Creek
 Sherman Creek
 Faulkner Brook
 Balls Creek

Left
 Town Brook
 Rose Brook
 Little Delaware River
 Bagley Brook
 Mallory Brook
 Weeds Brook
 Beers Brook
 Chase Brook
 Whitaker Brook
 Roods Creek
 Travis Brook
 Sands Creek

See also
List of rivers of New York
List of rivers of Pennsylvania

References

Rivers of New York (state)
Rivers of Pennsylvania
Catskill/Delaware watersheds
Tributaries of the Delaware River
Rivers of Wayne County, Pennsylvania
Rivers of Schoharie County, New York
Rivers of Delaware County, New York
Rivers of Broome County, New York
Borders of New York (state)
Borders of Pennsylvania